"Not Again" is a song by the American rock band Staind. It served as the lead single from the band's self-titled seventh studio album Staind. The song was released on July 19, 2011. The song reached number 1 on the Mainstream Rock Tracks chart for seven non-consecutive weeks. A music video was released for the song.

Background
According to singer Aaron Lewis, "Not Again" is about the recording process for the entire album, but is also open to the listener's interpretation: "It all manifested itself through the song–the duress and struggle that it was to make this record. I’ve always felt like if you tell people what the songs are about, as the writer...it kind of ruins the experience for the listener. It’s one of the great things about music, that from the listener’s point of view, they can see it for what they want to see it for. They can apply it to their life and how the words fit them, and not only see it through the face value of what it was written about."

Track listing

Charts

Weekly charts

Year-end charts

References

2011 singles
2011 songs
Staind songs
Atlantic Records singles
Roadrunner Records singles
Songs written by Aaron Lewis
Song recordings produced by Johnny K
Songs written by Mike Mushok